Power in the Blood is the fifteenth studio album by Buffy Sainte-Marie, released May 12, 2015, on True North Records.

The album includes both new material and contemporary re-recordings of some of her older songs. The title track is a cover of Alabama 3's song "Power in the Blood", from their 2002 album Power in the Blood.

Reception
In a review of the album for NPR, critic Ann Powers wrote that "those who know her mostly by reputation as a standout of the early '60s folk revival will be delighted to discover an artist who's more Bjork than Baez, more Kate Bush than Laurel Canyon. Sainte-Marie is a risk-taker, always chasing new sounds, and a plain talker when it comes to love and politics."

The Canadian music magazine Exclaim! also praised the album, with Stuart Henderson writing that "in fact, Power In The Blood might just be the best album she's made since the late 1960s."

Awards
It won the 2015 Polaris Music Prize on September 21, 2015.

Sainte-Marie won the Americana Music Award for Free Speech at their 2015 ceremony.

At the Juno Awards of 2016, the album won both Aboriginal Album of the Year and Contemporary Roots Album of the Year, and Sainte-Marie was nominated for Songwriter of the Year for "Farm in the Middle of Nowhere", "Ke Sakihitin Awasis (I Love You Baby)" and "Love Charms (Mojo Bijoux)".

Track listing
"It's My Way" (3:55)
"Power in the Blood" (4:03)
"We Are Circling" (3:04)
"Not the Lovin' Kind" (4:11)
"Love Charms (Mojo Bijoux)" (4:06)
"Ke Sakihitin Awasis (I Love You Baby)" (4:08)
"Farm in the Middle of Nowhere" (2:43)
"Generation" (3:54)
"Sing Our Own Song" (4:52)
"Orion" (3:00)
"The Uranium War" (3:33)
"Carry It On" (3:01)

References

2015 albums
Buffy Sainte-Marie albums
Polaris Music Prize-winning albums
True North Records albums
Albums produced by Michael Phillip Wojewoda
Albums produced by Jon Levine
Juno Award for Indigenous Music Album of the Year albums
Juno Award for Contemporary Roots Album of the Year albums